The Progressive Democratic Party is a newly established democratic party in Bangladesh. It is popularly known as the PDP. This party was launched on 21 June 2007 though a press conference, as soon as limited indoor political activity was allowed, although open politics was prohibited at that time as the country was still under a state of emergency.

The founder and president of the party, Ferdous Ahmed Qureshi, died at the end of August 2020. The Bangladesh Election Commission cancelled the party's registration in November of that year for not having a functioning central committee or sufficient offices at district and lower levels to maintain registration.

References

2007 establishments in Bangladesh
Political parties established in 2007
Political parties in Bangladesh